Jaqhi Qala (Aymara jaqhi precipice, cliff, qala stone, "cliff stone", also spelled Jakke Jala) is a mountain in the Andes of Bolivia which reaches a height of approximately . It is located in the Oruro Department, at the border of the Challapata Province, Challapata Municipality, and the Sebastián Pagador Province which is identical to the Santiago de Huari Municipality. Jaqhi Qala lies southwest of Phullu Qiri, northwest of Sirk'i and south of Chumpiri. The Jach'a Qala River originates at the mountain. It flows to the south.

References 

Mountains of Oruro Department